Stenoptilia viettei is a moth of the family Pterophoridae. It is known from Madagascar and Malawi.

References

viettei
Moths of Madagascar
Moths of Africa
Moths described in 1994